Erik Kristopher Raven is an American political advisor who serves as United States under secretary of the Navy in the Biden administration.

Education 
Raven earned an Associate of Arts degree from the College of Marin, a Bachelor of Arts degree in international relations from Connecticut College, and a Master of Arts degree in international history from the London School of Economics.

Career 
Raven began his career as a legislative assistant in the office of Senator Robert Byrd. He later served as Byrd's legislative director and national security advisor. He also worked in the offices of Senators Ted Kennedy and Dianne Feinstein. In 2006, Raven became a professional staffer for the United States Senate Committee on Appropriations. He has since served as majority clerk for the Senate Defense Appropriations Subcommittee.

Biden administration
On December 13, 2021, President Joe Biden nominated Raven to be the next undersecretary of the Navy. Hearings were held by the Senate Armed Services Committee on his nomination on March 22, 2022. His nomination was favorably reported by the committee on April 5, 2022. Raven was officially confirmed by the entire Senate via voice vote on April 7, 2022. He was sworn in on April 13, 2022.

References 

|-

Living people
Year of birth missing (living people)
College of Marin alumni
Connecticut College alumni
Alumni of the London School of Economics
Employees of the United States Senate
United States Under Secretaries of the Navy
Biden administration personnel